Leštinka may refer to places in the Czech Republic:

Leštinka (Chrudim District), a municipality and village in the Pardubice Region
Leštinka, a village and part of Světlá nad Sázavou in the Vysočina Region

See also
Leština (disambiguation)